Ted Nuce (born January 19, 1961) is an American former professional rodeo cowboy who specialized in bull riding. He is a 2009 ProRodeo Hall of Fame inductee. He was the Professional Rodeo Cowboys Association (PRCA) World Champion bull rider in 1985. He also won the Professional Bull Riders (PBR)'s inaugural World Finals event in 1994. He was also a co-founder of the PBR. 

A native of Escalon, California, Nuce turned pro in 1982. He was the champion of the PRCA California Circuit in bull riding in eight seasons: 1982, 1983, 1985, 1989, 1990, 1991, 1992, and 1994.

In 1996, the PBR inducted him into their Ring of Honor, an award "given annually to individuals who have made a significant and lasting contribution to the sport of professional bull riding, both in and out of the arena." Nuce was one of the four inaugural honorees. He retired from bull riding that same year. In 2018, he was inducted into the Bull Riding Hall of Fame.

Nuce was selected to be the coach for Team USA-Wolves, an all-Native American bull riding squad, for the 2020 PBR Global Cup in Arlington, Texas.

PRCA World Championship results

Results per the PRCA World Champions archive.

References

Living people
People from Escalon, California
Bull riders
ProRodeo Hall of Fame inductees
1961 births
Professional Bull Riders: Heroes and Legends